Pixey and Yarnton Meads is an  biological Site of Special Scientific Interest north of Oxford in Oxfordshire. It is a Nature Conservation Review site, Grade I, and part of Oxford Meadows Special Area of Conservation.

These are unimproved flood meadows on the bank of the River Thames. Their management is very well recorded, and it is known that they have been grazed and cut for hay for more than a thousand years, with the result that they are botanically rich, with more than 150 species. The site has been the subject of detailed botanical and hydrological research.

References

Sites of Special Scientific Interest in Oxfordshire
Nature Conservation Review sites
Special Areas of Conservation in England